Aichivirus A formerly Aichi virus (AiV) is a small, round, cytopathic positive sense and ssRNA virus. It belongs to the genus Kobuvirus in the family Picornaviridae. Aichivirus A was originally identified after a 1989 outbreak of acute gastroenteritis in the Aichi Prefecture, and was likely linked to raw oyster per genetic analysis.

It has since been isolated in studies of Finnish children, Pakistani children, and Japanese travelers.

References 

Picornaviridae